Mohammad Noh bin Salleh (born 15 March 1985) is a Malaysian singer-songwriter, musician, and record producer. He is best known as the frontman and principal songwriter of the rock band Hujan, with whom they have released six studio albums. He has also recorded with his side project EP, "Angin Kencang" and "Debu Bercahaya" as a solo artist.

Born in Kuching and raised in Miri, Sarawak, Noh moved to Kuala Lumpur and work as an assistant in recording studio own by Ahmad Idham. In between music sessions, he self-taught musical knowledge and ask the musicians about jazz chords that interested him. He began his career with Hujan in 2005, along with guitarist AG Coco who became a dominant figure in independent music scene. Their self-titled debut album Hujan in 2008, became the fastest-selling debut album in Malaysia history with massive success from the single "Pagi yang Gelap" and "Bila Aku Sudah Tiada".

Music career

Band
Noh began his music career as a hip hop singer with the group MIX with three of his friends; Asyraf Hardy, MC Wayne and Ogie. The trouped signed a contract with the Cat Presents Productions recording label owned by Cat Farish and appeared with their only album Mula Dari Dulu in 2006. MIX was later disbanded as Noh was starting his own band. 

Hujan began forming in 2005 after Noh uploaded some of his demos to Myspace, which later discovered by AG Coco whom introduce him to bigger audience in music scene. In earlier stage of Hujan, they were heavily influenced by jazz and rock in songwriting. Noh Salleh and Hang Dimas played their first gig on 17 February 2006 at Malam Pesta Gagalis Ubu in Lost Generation Space as Hujan.

Solo career
Noh debuted his solo work Angin Kencang in July 2014. The album was mainly inspired by his wife Mizz Nina with elements of 1960s and 1970s French popular music; and it was co-produced with Adink Permana, Ade Paloh and Mondo Gascaro from the Indonesian band Sore.

Personal life
Noh became engaged privately with Malaysian singer and television personality Mizz Nina on 6 November 2010, they eventually married on 1 July 2011. Mizz Nina and Noh Salleh announced on their Instagram that they had separated on 4 August 2022.

Discography

M.I.X
 Mula Dari Dulu (2006)

Hujan
 1, 2, 3, Go! (2007)
 Check Check Rock Rock (2007)
 Hujan (2008)
 Mencari Konklusi (2009)
 Lonely Soldier Boy (2010)
 Sang Enemy (2012)
 Jika Sempat (2016)
 Suria (2018)
 Pelangi & Kau (2020)

Da Vagabonds
 Da Vagabonds (2014)

Solo
 Angin Kencang (2014)
 Debu Bercahaya (2019)
 Bisikan (2020)

Other collaborations
 "Hantu" with M.I.X - (2006)
 "Puteri Santubong" with M.I.X - (2006)
 "Akademi Cinta" featuring Nas Adila with M.I.X - (2006)
 "Pelita" featuring A.P.I - Hooperz (2010)
 "Kurnia" featuring Mizz Nina - What Are You Waiting For (2010)
 "Selamat Pagi Sayang" featuring DJ Fuzz - Mixtape Mixology 3 (2010)
 "Kotarayaku" featuring Altimet - Kotarayaku (2011)

References

External links
 Noh Salleh at Discogs
 
 
 

1985 births
Living people
Malaysian singer-songwriters
People from Sarawak
Malaysian people of Malay descent
Malaysian Muslims
Malaysian male singer-songwriters